Saint is the designation of a holy person.

Saint(s) may also refer to:

Places

Saint
Le Saint, Brittany, France

Saints
Saints, Luton, Bedfordshire, England
Saints, Seine-et-Marne, France
Saints-en-Puisaye, formerly Saints, France
The Saints, Suffolk, England

Saintes
Saintes, Charente-Maritime, France
, a former commune in Belgium, part of Tubize
Îles des Saintes, French Antilles
Canton of Les Saintes, Guadeloupe

Battles
Battle of Saintes, a land battle between English and French forces in 1351
Battle of the Saintes, a naval battle between British and French forces in 1782

People
Saints, inhabitants of the island of St. Helena
Latter Day Saints
Saint (name)
Saint (rapper), Gambian recording artist, songwriter and producer

Sports teams
Lady Saints, American women's volleyball team
New Orleans Saints, American National Football League team
New York Saints, lacrosse team
Northampton Saints, English rugby union club
St Mirren F.C., Scottish football club
St Cuthbert Wanderers F.C., Scottish football club
St. George Illawarra Dragons, Australian Rugby League Club
St Helens R.F.C., English rugby league club
St Johnstone F.C., Scottish football club
St Kilda Football Club, Australian Rules Football club
St Patrick's Athletic F.C., Irish football club
St. Paul Saints, American minor league baseball team
Siena Saints, the sports teams of Siena College
Southampton F.C., English football team
Winnipeg Saints, a defunct Canadian junior ice hockey team

Fiction
Saint (film), a 2010 Dutch dark comedy horror
Saint (manhua), comics by Hong Kong manhua artist Khoo Fuk Lung
Saint (novel), a 2006 novel by Ted Dekker
Saint (Sugar Rush), a character in the British TV series Sugar Rush
Saints (Boondock), three vigilantes in the film Boondock Saints
Saints (novel), a 1984 novel by Orson Scott Card
Saints, warriors fighting in the name of the goddess Athena in the manga and anime Saint Seiya by Masami Kurumada
"The Saint" (Law & Order: Criminal Intent), episode 16, season 3, in the Law & Order: Criminal Intent TV series
The Saint (Simon Templar), the protagonist of a series of books by Leslie Charteris
The Saint (1997 film), 1997 film starring Val Kilmer based on the Leslie Charteris series
The Saint (2017 film), a television film
The 3rd Street Saints, a street gang in the Saints Row series of video games
Saint, an alien race in the Mahoromatic manga and anime series
One half of Boxers and Saints, graphic novels by Gene Luen Yang

Music
The Saint (music venue), a music venue featuring live, original music in Asbury Park, New Jersey
The Saints (Australian band), Australian punk band
The Saints (Jamaican band)
The Saints (British band), London skiffle band
Saint (band), American Christian metal band
Utah Saints, English band

Albums
Saints (Destroy the Runner album)
Saints (Marc Ribot album), 2001
Saint, an album by James Reid

Songs
"Saints" (song), by The Breeders from the album Last Splash
"When the Saints Go Marching In", also known as "The Saints"
"Saint", by Travis Scott and Quavo from the album Huncho Jack, Jack Huncho
"Saint", by Marilyn Manson from the album The Golden Age of Grotesque

Other uses
SAINT (institute), Sungkyunkwan Advanced Institute of Nanotechnology of South Korea
SAINT (software), Security Administrator’s Integrated Network Tool
Saints (book), a history of the LDS Church
Saints Peakhurst Coaches, a defunct bus company in Sydney, Australia
Seigakuin Atlanta International School, a Japanese international private school known as SAINTS
Springfield Armory SAINT, a series of semi-automatic firearms

 Project SAINT, SAtellite INTerceptor system in the early 1960s.

See also
 Portal:Saints
The Saint (disambiguation)